Amaranthus crispus is a species of flowering plant in the family Amaranthaceae. It is referred to by the common name crispleaf amaranth.  It is a herbaceous, sparsely pubescent annual plant.  It can grow up to 0.5 m (1.5 ft) in height. It flowers in summer to fall.  It usually grows in waste places, disturbed habitats, or near water.  It is native to Argentina, Chile and Uruguay and has been introduced into Australia, Austria, Bulgaria, Crimea, Czechoslovakia, France, Hungary, Italy, Romania, Sardinia, the United States, and Yugoslavia.

References

Taxonomic, Scientific, and Distribution Information at Flora of North America (efloras.org)

crispus
Taxa named by Alexander Braun
Taxa named by John Merle Coulter
Taxa named by Sereno Watson
Flora of Argentina
Flora of Chile
Flora of Uruguay